{{DISPLAYTITLE:C14H8O4}}
The molecular formula C14H8O4 (molar mass : 240.21 g/mol) may refer to:

 Alizarin, a prominent dye
 Dantron, an anthraquinone derivative
 1,3-Dihydroxyanthraquinone
 1,4-Dihydroxyanthraquinone